Eero Lehtovirta (28 November 1926 – 27 June 2003) was a Finnish rower. He competed in the men's eight event at the 1952 Summer Olympics.

References

1926 births
2003 deaths
Finnish male rowers
Olympic rowers of Finland
Rowers at the 1952 Summer Olympics